The 1979–80 season was the 42nd season of competitive association football in the Football League played by Chester, an English club based in Chester, Cheshire.

Also, it was the fifth season spent in the Third Division after the promotion from the Fourth Division in 1975. Alongside competing in the Football League the club also participated in the FA Cup, Football League Cup and the Welsh Cup.

Football League

Results summary

Results by matchday

Matches

FA Cup

League Cup

Welsh Cup

Season statistics

References

1979-80
English football clubs 1979–80 season